Alan la Zouche (1205–1270) was an English nobleman and soldier of Breton descent. He built the Zouches Manor.

Background
The surname "la Zouche" may have derived from souch or zuche in Norman French indicating someone of stocky build.

He was the elder son of Roger de la Zouche and Margaret Biset and the grandson of Alain de Porhoet who took the name Alan la Zouche when he arrived in England. This elder Alan, the first of the family to be established in England, was a younger son of Geoffrey, viscount of Porhoet in Brittany (d. 1141); Geoffrey's older brother, Odo II, Viscount of Porhoët, was for a few years Count of Brittany, by marriage. Under Henry II Alain de Porhoet, or Alan la Zouche, established himself in England, and married Adeline de Belmais, sole heiress of the house of Belmais, her inheritance including Tong Castle in Shropshire, Ashby (afterwards called Ashby-de-la-Zouch) in Leicestershire, North Molton in Devonshire, and other lands in Cambridgeshire and elsewhere. Alain and Adeline's son Roger la Zouche (1182-1238), succeeded in turn to these estates. Roger's support for Arthur of Brittany was almost fatal to him in 1203, but he managed to regain King John's favour. On 10 November 1228 he was appointed Sheriff of Devonshire. On 28 January 1237 he witnessed the signature of Henry III confirming the Magna Carta.

Early service
On 15 June 1242 Alan was summoned to attend the king, Henry III, with horses and arms in Gascony. He was at La Sauve in October, at Bordeaux in March and April 1243, and at La Réole in November. Before 6 August 1250 la Zouche was appointed justice of Chester and of the four cantreds in North Wales. Matthew Paris says that he got this office by outbidding his predecessor, John de Grey. He offered to pay twelve hundred marks for the post instead of five hundred. La Zouche boasted that Wales was nearly all reduced to obedience to the English laws, but his high-handed acts provoked royal interference and censure. He continued in office as the Lord Edward's deputy after the king's grant of Chester and Wales to his eldest son.

In Ireland
Ireland had been among the lands which Edward had received from Henry III in 1254. In the spring of 1256, la Zouche was sent there in service to Lord Edward, and soon afterwards he was appointed justiciar of Ireland under Edward, his first official mandate being dated 27 June 1256. In 1257 he was still in Ireland. In April 1258 he was ordered to repay 60 shillings which he had borrowed from Edward to supply food for 300 members of Edward's household while they were in Ulster. On 28 June 1258 he received a mandate from the king, now under the control of the barons, not to admit any justice or other officer appointed by Edward to Ireland unless the appointment had the consent of the king and the barons. However, he ceased to hold office soon after this, Stephen Longespee being found acting as justiciar in October 1258.

Loyalist
During the barons' wars la Zouche adhered to the king. He was on 9 July 1261 appointed High Sheriff of Northamptonshire, receiving in October a letter from the king urging him to keep his office despite any baronial interlopers. He remained sheriff until 1264, and sometimes ignored the provisions of Magna Carta by acting as justice itinerant in his own shire and also in Buckinghamshire and Hampshire. In 1261 he was also made justice of the forests south of Trent, and in 1263 king's seneschal. In April 1262 he held forest pleas at Worcester.

On 12 December 1263, he was one of the royalist barons who agreed to submit all points of dispute to the arbitration of Louis IX. According to some accounts he was taken prisoner early in the battle of Lewes by John Giffard. He escaped almost immediately and took refuge in Lewes Priory, where he is said to have been found after the fight disguised as a monk.

In the summer of 1266 he was one of the committee of twelve arbitrators appointed to arrange the terms of the surrender of Kenilworth Castle. On 23 June 1267, after the peace between Henry III and Gilbert de Clare, 8th Earl of Gloucester, he was appointed warden of London and constable of the Tower. He continued in office until Michaelmas, whereupon his tenure was prolonged until Easter 1268.

In 1270 la Zouche had a suit against Earl Warenne with regard to a certain estate. On 19 June the trial was proceeding before the justices at Westminster Hall, and la Zouche seemed likely to win the case. He was murderously attacked by Earl Warenne and his followers. Roger, his son, was wounded and driven from the hall; Alan himself was seriously injured and left on the spot. He was still surviving when, on 4 August, Warenne made his peace with the crown and agreed to pay substantial compensation to the injured Zouches. He died on 10 August, and on 20 October his son Roger inherited his estate.

Alan's brother Eudo established the branch of the la Zouche family at Harringworth in Northamptonshire.

Legacy
Alan la Zouche was a benefactor of the Knights Templars, to whom he gave lands at Sibford, and to the Belmeis family foundation of Buildwas Abbey, after having carried on protracted lawsuits with that house.

Family
Alan la Zouche married Helen (d. 20 August 1296), one of the daughters and coheirs of Roger de Quincy, 2nd Earl of Winchester, and in 1267 succeeded to her share of the Quincy estates, and had issue:
 Roger la Zouche (1242-1285), married Ela Longespee, daughter of Stephen Longspee and Emmeline de Ridelsford and granddaughter of William Longspee, an illegitimate son of King Henry II of England. He was the father of Alan la Zouche, 1st Baron la Zouche of Ashby. 
 Helen who died in infancy
 William
 Oliver
 Margaret, married Robert FitzRoger, Lord of Clavering (Essex), and had issue:
 John de Clavering, Baron (1266 - 13 January 1332), married Hawise de Tybetot
 Euphemia FitzRobert de Clavering (1267-1329), married Jollan de Neville and Ralph Neville, 1st Baron Neville de Raby.
 Elizabeth Clavering, married John De Mauteby
 Robert Clavering
 Alexander Clavering
 Henry Clavering
 Roger Clavering, Of Burgh (b. 1278), married Beatrice de Clavering
 Edmund Clavering
 Anastasia, married Ralph de Neville
 Henry who died in infancy

References
 
 
 'My History' by Lucy la Zouche - see www.lucylazouche.com

Notes

Attribution

1205 births
1270 deaths
13th-century English people
English people of Breton descent
Anglo-Normans
High Sheriffs of Northamptonshire
Lords Lieutenant of Ireland
La Zouche family